Tytti is a given name. Notable people with the name include:

Tytti Isohookana-Asunmaa (born 1947), Finnish politician
Tytti Seppänen (born 1980), Finnish politician
Tytti Tuppurainen (born 1976), Finnish politician

Finnish feminine given names